Prisovjani is a village in Municipality of Struga, North Macedonia.

Population
The current population is 11 Macedonians. Ethnic groups in the village include:

References

Villages in Struga Municipality
Albanian communities in North Macedonia